The Denver Eagle is a gay bar in Denver, Colorado, United States. It is one of many unaffiliated gay bars in dozens of different cities using the "Eagle" name. It caters primarily to the leather and bear subcultures. 

The original Denver Eagle was located at 1475 36th St. in the RiNo Arts district of Denver. It was known for its large gold penis shaped door handles. In April 2016 The Denver Eagle closed due to the property being bought by a developer and The Eagle losing their lease. 

In March 2018, a new location opened at 1246 E. 31st Ave. It closed a few months later.

In 2022, new owners purchased a building at 5110 W Colfax Ave. The building was home to "The Den" a now defunct gay bar. The grand opening was held March 19-22 with the theme "The Eagle Has Landed." The Denver Eagle is one of a few black-owned gay bars in the United States.

Events 

The Eagle Denver has a kitchen and serves food in addition to holding themed events.

Reception 
Best of Denver. Best Leather Bar That Should Be Featured in Architectural Digest, 2007.

References 

LGBT nightclubs in Colorado
LGBT drinking establishments in the United States
Drinking establishments in Colorado
Buildings and structures in Denver